"Heartbreak Hotel" is a song by American singer Whitney Houston. Originally written for inclusion on TLC's third studio album FanMail, it was later recorded by Houston after TLC rejected the song. It was released as the second single from Houston's 1998 album My Love Is Your Love. The song prominently features R&B singers Faith Evans and Kelly Price during the choruses and bridge.

The song reached number two on the US Billboard Hot 100 and peaked at number one on Billboards Hot R&B/Hip-Hop Songs chart on February 2, 1999. "Heartbreak Hotel" was certified platinum by the Recording Industry Association of America (RIAA). It was also a hit in many countries worldwide. The song received two nominations at the 2000 Grammy Awards for Best R&B Song and Best R&B Performance by a Duo or Group with Vocal. The video, directed by Kevin Bray, was nominated for Best R&B Video at the 1999 MTV Video Music Awards.

Composition 
"Heartbreak Hotel" is written in the key of E minor with a tempo of 67 beats per minute in common time.  The chords in the song alternate between Em7 and Am7, and the vocals in the song span from G3 to A5.

Release 
It is the second single released from Houston's My Love Is Your Love album. It holds the distinction as being one of only three songs to be on both discs for Houston's 2000 Greatest Hits collection, in its original and remixed formats. It is absent on both 2007's The Ultimate Collection, and the standard edition of 2012's I Will Always Love You: The Best of Whitney Houston, though some regions were given a deluxe edition of the latter album, in which the song is included.

Reception

Critical reception 
Billboard magazine reviewed the song very favorably saying, "[It's] a highly effective setting for Houston, who wears her emotions on her sleeve and serves up one of the most effective performances on the album. Price and Evans sell themselves grandly as empathetic sisters alongside their pained friend, soaring with emotion and helping keep the timeless artist identifiable to a new generation of R&B fans. Of course, R&B radio will give this a hug in an instant." NME also reviewed the song positively: "Although the appeal of this oddly-paced mid-tempo relies heavily on the 'girls united in rejection' ethos, it works because the guest vocalists appearing with Houston – Faith Evans and Kelly Price – are two enormously talented singers who have carved out careers specializing in soulful balladry. Their respective abilities to wring emotion out of the written word means that anything they sing is seen as sincere. [...] But the risk of having three individually successful singers collaborate on one track is that the song could drown in the weight of competitive vocal acrobatics. But Houston, Evans and Price are secure in their gifts[.] Confident without being cocky, emotive without being melodramatic, they've made a tidy meal of this track[.]"

Commercial performance 
"Heartbreak Hotel" entered the US Billboard Hot 100 chart at number 84 with airplay alone as there was not yet a retail single; issue date of December 26, 1998. On its first week that retail release impacted the song's chart position; it leaped from number 55 to 29, and spent three weeks at number two on the Hot 100. Additionally, the song entered the revamped Billboard Hot R&B Singles & Tracks chart at number 23 with the mark of its seventh week on the chart, the issue date of January 9, 1999. In its first week on retail release, the song reached the number six and the following week topped the chart, becoming her eighth number-one single on the Hot R&B chart. The single stayed on the summit for seven consecutive weeks from February 13 to March 27, 1999, which was her third longest stay atop the Hot R&B chart behind "I Will Always Love You" for 11 weeks in 1992–1993 and "Exhale (Shoop Shoop)" for eight weeks in 1995–1996, and was on the chart for a total of 31 weeks. It placed at number four and number three, on the Billboard year-end Hot 100 Singles and Hot R&B Singles & Tracks chart, respectively.  It was certified Platinum for shipments of 1,000,000 copies or more by the Recording Industry Association of America on March 2, 1999. According to Nielsen SoundScan, the single sold over 1,300,000 copies in the US alone, making it the country's third best-selling single of 1999.

Awards and nominations 
"Heartbreak Hotel" was nominated for Best R&B Video at the 1999 MTV Video Music Awards. The song was also nominated for "R&B Single of the Year" at the 10th Billboard Music Awards on December 8, 1999, and for Best R&B Performance by a Duo or Group with Vocal and Best R&B Song at the 42nd Grammy Awards on February 23, 2000. Houston was honored with a NAACP Image Award for Outstanding Female Artist for the song at its 31st ceremony on April 6, 2000. It was nominated for "Favorite Single" at the 6th Blockbuster Entertainment Awards on May 9, 2000. On May 16, 2000, the song won the Broadcast Music Incorporated (BMI) Pop Award at its 48th ceremony.

Live performances 
Houston first performed an edited version of "Heartbreak Hotel" live on The Rosie O'Donnell Show on November 23, 1998, appearing with Faith Evans and Kelly Price to promote My Love Is Your Love. The three women performed the song together at the 9th Billboard Music Awards on December 7, 1998. During her European promotion in February 1999, the song was performed live by Houston alone on the French television show, Les Annees Tube. On June 27 that year, Houston made a surprise appearance at the 13th Annual New York City Lesbian & Gay Pride Dance and performed a remixed version of the song along with "It's Not Right But It's Okay". Video of the performance premiered on MTV All Access on July 21, 1999.

During her My Love Is Your Love World Tour in 1999, the song was second on the tour's setlist. Houston added elements from the Jackson Five hit "This Place Hotel" to end the song. One performance on the tour was broadcast live on Polish TV channel, TVP1, on August 22, 1999. "Heartbreak Hotel" was included in the setlist of Soul Divas Tour in 2004 and performed at Live & Loud Music Festival in Kuala Lumpur, Malaysia on December 1, 2007.

Track listings 

 US CD maxi-single
 "Heartbreak Hotel" (album version) – 4:41
 "Heartbreak Hotel" (Hex Hector radio mix) – 4:20
 "Heartbreak Hotel" (Hex Hector club mix) – 8:44
 "It's Not Right but It's Okay" (Thunderpuss 2000 radio mix) – 4:11
 "It's Not Right but It's Okay" (Thunderpuss 2000 club mix) – 9:14
 "It's Not Right but It's Okay" (Thunderpuss 2000 dub) – 8:19
 "It's Not Right but It's Okay" (Johnny Vicious radio mix) – 4:14
 "It's Not Right but It's Okay" (Johnny Vicious Momentous mix) – 13:03
 "It's Not Right but It's Okay" (Johnny Vicious dub) – 8:31

 US CD single
 "Heartbreak Hotel" (original radio mix) – 3:59
 "Heartbreak Hotel" (dance mix) – 4:20
 "It's Not Right but It's Okay" (dance mix) – 4:11

 US 12-inch vinyl (Remixes)
A1: "Heartbreak Hotel" (Hex Hector club mix) – 8:44
B1: "Heartbreak Hotel" (Hex Hector NYC Rough mix) – 9:14
B2: "Heartbreak Hotel" (Hex Hector radio mix) – 4:20

 UK CD maxi-single
 "Heartbreak Hotel" (R.I.P. radio edit) – 3:42
 "Heartbreak Hotel" (Undadoggz radio edit) – 3:39
 "Heartbreak Hotel" (album version) – 4:41
 "Heartbreak Hotel" (Undadoggz club rub pt.1) – 5:55

 German CD maxi-single
 "Heartbreak Hotel" (R.I.P. radio mix) – 3:40
 "Love to Infinity Megamix" (edit) – 5:17
 "Heartbreak Hotel" (album version) – 4:41
 "Heartbreak Hotel" (Undadoggz club rub pt.2) – 4:30
 "Love to Infinity Megamix" (extended) – 9:22

 German CD maxi-single
 "Heartbreak Hotel" (R.I.P. radio edit) – 3:42
 "Heartbreak Hotel" (Undadoggz radio edit) – 3:39
 "Heartbreak Hotel" (album version) – 4:38
 "Megamix" (Love to Infinity edit) – 5:17
 "I Will Always Love You" – 4:23
 "Heartbreak Hotel" (music video) – 4:03
 "Megamix" (Love to Infinity edit) (music video) – 5:17

Charts and certifications

Weekly charts

Year-end charts

Certifications 

|}

Release history

See also 
 R&B number-one hits of 1999 (USA)
 Number-one dance hits of 1999 (USA)

References

External links 
 Heartbreak Hotel at Discogs

Whitney Houston songs
Faith Evans songs
Kelly Price songs
1990s ballads
1998 songs
1998 singles
1999 singles
2000 singles
Arista Records singles
Bertelsmann Music Group singles
Contemporary R&B ballads
Pop ballads
Song recordings produced by Soulshock and Karlin
Songs about heartache
Songs written by Kenneth Karlin
Songs written by Soulshock
Songs written by Tamara Savage